Tired of the Runnin' is the second studio album by American country music duo The O'Kanes. It was released in 1988 via Columbia Records. The album includes the singles "One True Love", "Blue Love" and "Rocky Road".

Track listing

Chart performance

References

1988 albums
The O'Kanes albums
Columbia Records albums